Hanover Drama is a theatre company in Hanover, the state capital of Lower Saxony, Germany. Collectively these venues have five stages:
large stage
Cumberland stage
Cumberland gallery
Ballyard One
Ballyard Two

Hanover Drama is part of the publicly-funded umbrella performing arts organisation  Hanover State Theatre of Lower Saxony, or simply Hanover State Theatre. This organisation comprises the following divisions that put on operas, stage productions, and concert programs, in addition to maintaining a theatre museum, with seasons running from September through to June.

Venues 
Hanover Playhouse, the main venue, was built in 1992 close to the main railway station, and is a complex that incorporates the parts of the  that survived the aerial bombings of Hanover during World War II. Designed by the Swiss architect  the large stage is situated on the second floor andseating 630 peopleis typically the location of the opening of a new season. Two smaller stages are located in adjacent buildings; the Cumberland gallery, a heritage-listed building with a large staircase, is used for events with up to 85 spectators, and the Cumberland stage, a former rehearsal stage, for events with up to 198 spectators.

The complex also houses Hanover Theatre Museum, which presents temporary exhibitions and documentation of the history of the theatre.

Since the turn of the millennia, Ballyard One and Ballyard Two, which were the main stages for plays in the city for a long time, are used for youth theatre and opera.

General references

References

External links 

 
 180 Panorama photo of the Schauspielhaus
 

Theatre companies in Germany